Rubén Díaz Jr. (born April 26, 1973) is an American politician who served as the 13th borough president of The Bronx in New York City from 2009 to 2021. He was elected in April 2009 and reelected in 2013 and 2017. He previously served in the New York State Assembly.

Early life and education
Díaz's parents moved from Puerto Rico to New York, where he was born and received his primary and secondary education in the Bronx. He graduated first from LaGuardia Community College, then Lehman College with a bachelor's degree in political theory. Díaz's father, Rubén Díaz, is a former New York City Councilman and a former member of the New York State Senate.

Career

New York State Assembly 
Díaz was elected to the New York State Assembly at the age of twenty-three, which made him the youngest person elected to the legislative body since Theodore Roosevelt.

While in the Assembly, Díaz sponsored, co-sponsored and passed legislation addressing health care, public records access, minimum wage and overtime pay, environmental protection, equitable labor standards, insurance fraud, tenants rights, transparency and disclosure in all environmental impact statements, pedestrian safety, school bus safety, protection from tax preparers, Senior Citizens rights, wider access to the Senior Citizens Rent Increase Exemption (SCRIE) Program, and the regulation and accountability of gas and electric companies.

A member of the Assembly Education Committee, Díaz has been outspoken on educational issues. He has addressed the International Democratic Education Conference (IDEC) and praised the Campaign for Fiscal Equity's (CFE) efforts to protect the constitutional right to a basic education. In 2003, when Governor George Pataki sought to cut the State's higher education budget, Díaz was a vocal critic of this plan and, together with other state legislators, was able to restore funding for some of the Governor's proposed cuts.

Díaz has legislated on behalf of Brownfield Cleanup and Green Roof Tax Abatement, worked to restore the Bronx River which runs through the 85th Assembly District, and opposed environmental racism.

In September 2007, he was named one of City Hall'''s "40 under 40" for being a young influential member of New York City politics.

Amadou Diallo
On February 4, 1999, Amadou Diallo, a young African immigrant, was killed by four New York City police officers who fired 41 unanswered rounds at him. Since the shooting occurred in his South Bronx district, Díaz became an advocate and organizer for the Diallo family. Through a series of public appearances, hearings, press conferences and massive public demonstrations, Díaz led a citywide protest which drew national media attention. Díaz marched together with Rev. Al Sharpton, the Rev. Jesse Jackson, actress Susan Sarandon, dozens of rabbis and other clergy, and was arrested for his peaceful protest. As a result, Díaz became known for his support of civil and human rights.

The Rainbow Rebels
In summer 2008, Díaz became a founding member of a progressive civic and political group known as the "Rainbow Rebels", who achieved sudden and widespread popularity throughout the Bronx County of New York.

On August 22, 2008, the Rainbow Rebels made their first official announcement: Díaz joined with two of his Assembly colleagues Carl Heastie and Michael Benjamin, both Democratic African Americans, and with Assemblyman Jeffrey Dinowitz of Riverdale and his powerful Benjamin Franklin Reform Democratic Club, to promote the candidacy of Elizabeth Taylor for a Civil Court judgeship. On September 9, 2008, Taylor won the Democratic primary for the judgeship, despite opposition from the Bronx County Leader, Jose Rivera, and the Bronx political machine known as "County".

On September 28, 2008, at the Bronx County Committee meeting, the Rainbow Rebels won another significant victory by replacing the Bronx County Leader José Rivera with Assemblyman Carl Heastie.

Bronx Borough President
On February 18, 2009, U.S. President Barack Obama appointed Bronx Borough president Adolfo Carrión Jr. to the position of Director of the White House Office on Urban Affairs. When Mayor Michael Bloomberg declared a special election to choose his successor, Díaz was considered the leading candidate for the position.

The special election was held on April 21, 2009. Díaz defeated the Republican Party candidate Anthony Ribustello with an overwhelming 87% of the vote, to become the 13th borough president of the Bronx.

On July 1, 2009, Díaz appointed Delores Fernandez to the reconstituted New York City Board of Education. Fernandez is anticipated to be the sole member of the Board who will have a perspective independent of the mayor, Michael Bloomberg. Díaz ended his first summer as borough president by recommending that the New York City Council reject Related Companies' proposal to turn the Kingsbridge Armory into a shopping mall. In an editorial in the New York Daily News, Díaz wrote that he is "fighting to make sure that this development includes 'living wage' jobs that offer health insurance". Related's proposal is still going through the city's review process.

In 2017, Díaz won the Democratic primary for borough president with 86% of the vote. On the same day, his father won the Democratic primary to return to the City Council from the Senate.

In January 2020, Díaz announced that he would not seek re-election in 2021.

 New York City mayoral campaign 

In 2018, Diaz was the first candidate to file to run in the 2021 New York City mayoral election. Diaz dropped out in January 2020, saying he wanted to spend more time with his family.

 Personal life 
Díaz lives in the southeast Bronx. He and his wife Hilda have two adult sons.

See also
 Timeline of the Bronx, 21st c.
 Paterson, David "Black, Blind, & In Charge: A Story of Visionary Leadership and Overcoming Adversity."''Skyhorse Publishing. New York, New York, 2020

References

External links
 
People for Diaz

|-

|-

1973 births
2012 United States presidential electors
2016 United States presidential electors
2020 United States presidential electors
American politicians of Puerto Rican descent
Bronx borough presidents
Candidates in the 2021 United States elections
Hispanic and Latino American state legislators in New York (state)
Lehman College alumni
Living people
Democratic Party members of the New York State Assembly
Politicians from the Bronx
Puerto Rican people in New York (state) politics